Börje Kalevi Strand (23 September 1935 – 30 April 1977) was a Finnish sprinter. He competed in the men's 4 × 400 metres relay at the 1960 Summer Olympics.

References

External links

1935 births
1977 deaths
Athletes (track and field) at the 1960 Summer Olympics
Finnish male sprinters
Olympic athletes of Finland
Place of birth missing